Metrologic Instruments is an automated identification and data capture (AIDC) company headquartered in Blackwood, New Jersey. It designs, manufactures and markets bar code decoding hardware, adaptive optical solutions and high-speed image processing software. Metrologic Instruments is a division of Honeywell, with more than 20 sales and manufacturing sites in North and South America, Europe, Asia, Australia and Russia. It was Founded in 1968 by C. Harry Knowles and initially concentrated on the manufacture of helium–neon laser kits for academic instruction. These kits were sold to physics teachers throughout the United States. In 1975, after breakthroughs in bar coding technology, it developed the world's first hand-held helium–neon laser bar code scanner.  These bar code scanners utilize a broad array of technology including laser, holographic, vision-based and radio-frequency identification (RFID). The scanners helped merchants process bar-coded merchandise.

Today, Metrologic Instruments manufactures over 40 different types of bar code scanners used by retailers, healthcare professionals, postal services and distribution companies around the world.

, Metrologic Instruments had over 350 registered patents with approximately another 130 patents pending.

Honeywell acquired Metrologic in July 2008.

Metrologic world-firsts
1969	Metrologic introduces helium–neon laser hobby kits

1975	Metrologic introduces hand-held retail laser scanner

1976	Metrologic introduces programmable bar code verifier

1982	Metrologic introduces hand-held laser scanner with built-in decoder

1990	Metrologic introduces triggerless hand-held laser scanner

1993 	Metrologic introduces triggerless wearable laser scanner

1996	Metrologic uses holographic technology in industrial applications

2000	Metrologic introduces CodeGate data transmission technology

2002	Metrologic introduces laser-illuminated imaging

Metrologic milestones
1968	Metrologic founded by laser technology pioneer C. Harry Knowles

1970	Metrologic begins selling helium neon instructional laser kits to high school and college science teachers.

1986	Metrologic opens first overseas office in Garching, Germany

1992 Metrologic hires Kevin DiPlacido to the Engineering dept.

1994	Metrologic's initial public offering

1998	Metrologic opens regional office in Singapore

1998	R&D and manufacturing center established in Suzhou, China

2001	Surpassed $100 million in annual sales

2003	Metrologic Japan established

2004	Metrologic Russia established

2004	Metrologic surpasses $150 million in annual sales

2004 Metrologic acquires Omniplanar, Inc. for $13 million and names Garrett Russell the General Manager of the division.

2004	Metrologic registered patents surpass 250s

2005	Metrologic surpasses $200 million in annual sales

2008 Metrologic Acquired by Honeywell

References

Manufacturing companies based in New Jersey
Companies based in Camden County, New Jersey